Hit (also spelled Heet or al-Hit) is a village in southern Syria, administratively part of the al-Suwayda Governorate, located northeast of al-Suwayda. It is situated on the northern end of Jabal al-Arab. Nearby localities include Shaqqa to the south, Umm al-Zaytun and Amrah to the southwest, al-Hayyat to the north and al-Buthainah to the east. According to the Syria Central Bureau of Statistics (CBS), Hit had a population of 655 in the 2004 census. The inhabitants are mostly Christians and Druze.

History and archaeology
Hit is identified with the ancient city of Eitha. During Herodian rule, it served as the principal military base for the volcanic Lejah region. Ruins in Hit dating from the Roman period include a two-floor villa and a large reservoir. An inscription dating to 232 CE found in Hit reveals that during that time a strategos ("local chief, quasi-royal official") administered the town. Sometime during the years 354 and 355 CE, the Byzantine deacon of the area, Sabinianos, constructed a church in Eitha dedicated to Sergius in honor of his death in the early 4th century. The church, which had been part of a monastery, was one of the earliest sanctuaries to be dedicated to a Christian saint at a place other than the site of the saint's martyrdom.

Ottoman era
In 1838 Hit was noted  by Eli Smith as being located in Jebel Hauran, and inhabited by Catholics.

According to Western traveler Josias Leslie Porter, Hit once had a population of about 10,000, but in the 1850s it was down to  several hundred inhabitants. He further noted that most of the village was covered with ancient ruins and most of the inhabited houses were also ancient. A temple dedicated to the pagan deity Jupiter, a fountain built by a Roman official named Aelius Mazimos and another fountain dating to 120 CE were found in Hit. In 1862, during the late Ottoman era in Syria, the Druze Bani Amer clan controlled Hit along with seven other villages in the area. During an uprising by peasants in Jabal al-Arab, Hit's inhabitants revolted against the sheikhs ("chiefs") of the Bani Amer clan.

Modern era
In 1927, under French Mandate rule, Hit was a rural village that had a Christian majority of 284 persons, and a Druze minority of 182. It was the only village in Jabal al-Arab proper with a mostly Christian population.

See also
 Druze in Syria
 Christianity in Syria

References

Bibliography

External links
 Map of town, Google Maps

Populated places in Shahba District
Druze communities in Syria
Eastern Orthodox Christian communities in Syria